Zak Surety (born 4 October 1991) is an English professional snooker player. He practises frequently with Stuart Bingham and Allan Taylor.

Career
As an amateur, Surety based in Basildon entered in Players Tour Championship events from their establishment in 2010, with his best result as an amateur being a run to the last 32 stages of the 2012 UKPTC 3, with wins over Jack Lisowski and Oliver Lines in the main stages. Surety also entered Q School in 2011, 2012 and 2013 in the hope of winning a place on the main tour; however, he was unsuccessful, but came close in the second event in 2013, losing 4–1 to Ryan Clark in the final stage. His Q School performances however won him a top up place in four professional ranking events in 2013–14, but he failed to qualify for all four, winning only one match, 5–4 over Patrick Einsle in the 2013 Australian Goldfields Open.

In April 2014, Surety won a place on the professional World Snooker Tour for the 2014–15 and 2015–16 seasons after coming through the EBSA Amateur Cup play-offs with wins over Michael Tomlinson and Michael Georgiou, both 4–1.

Debut season
Surety lost his first five matches as a professional, before beating Mark King 6–3 to qualify for the International Championship where David Gilbert defeated him 6–4 in the first round. He was knocked out in the first round of the UK Championship and Welsh Open by Michael Holt and Graeme Dott respectively but qualified for the China Open by seeing off Li Hang 5–4. Surety won three frames in a row to beat Joe Swail 5–4 to reach the last 32 of a ranking event for the first time and quickly raced into a 4–1 lead over Robert Milkins. Milkins cut the gap to 4–3, before Surety saw his best chance to win come in the next frame when he opened it with a 65 break, but he went on to lose it and the match in a deciding frame. Milkins apologised to Surety for his behaviour during the match afterwards. Surety's debut campaign ended with a 10–8 defeat to Zhou Yuelong in the first round of World Championship qualifying, which saw him placed 97th in the world rankings.

2015/2016 season
All players on the snooker tour receive entry to the first round of the UK Championship and Welsh Open, these were the only events Surety could reach in the 2015–16 season. He lost 6–4 to Jack Lisowski in the first round of the UK and 4–1 to Joe Swail in the first round of the Welsh. Surety dropped off the tour after being unable to break into the top 64 in the world rankings during his two-year stay and he entered Q School in an attempt to win his place back. In the second event he lost 4–1 in the final round to David John, but he would gain entry in to some events next season as a top-up player due to his high Q School Order of Merit ranking.

2016/2017 season
4–2 and 4–1 victories over Kyren Wilson and Antony Parsons saw Surety qualify for the European Masters and he was knocked out 4–1 by Liang Wenbo in the first round. He reached the second round of the Northern Ireland Open by beating Darryl Hill 4–3, but lost 4–2 to Hossein Vafaei. Surety dropped off the tour at the end of the year after failing to progress through Q School.

Performance and rankings timeline

References

English snooker players
Sportspeople from Basildon
1991 births
Living people